Brian Fogarty is an English novelist, short story writer, poet, painter, and printmaker.

Fogarty was born in Hackney in the East End of London, England. He moved to Ealing in West London and aged 18 became lead singer in The City Lights, a rock band. He began write songs and poetry. He then started writing novels, the first of which was The Cage. He studied acting at The Questors Theatre in Ealing and established The Intimate Theatre group. He wrote, directed, and acted in Journey into Autumn, a play with music and ballet, at the Oval House Theatre in London.

He moved to Chichester, continuing to write poetry and short stories. He also began to draw and paint. He studied for a year at Chichester College of Further Education and then travelled to live and teach English for two years in Sudan, where he learned Arabic. He also researched his novel Red over Blue.

On his return to England, Fogarty lived in Cambridge, where he taught English and worked on drafts of Red over Blue (initially called The Chrysalis). He published a short story, "The Greenhouse", in Panurge, a literary magazine. One of his poems, The Nightdress, was published in the London Magazine.

In 1990, Fogarty moved to Brighton, continuing work on Red over Blue. He also began three further novels, including The Feeders. He restarted his painting and drawing. In 2005, he won the David Rose Prize of the Sussex County Arts Club for his painting That Blue Dress.

A collection of stories and poems, The Greenhouse, was published in 2006, followed by The Feeders and Red over Blue. In 2013, Fogarty held a solo exhibition of paintings, Soul in search of a canvas, at The Gallery in Cork Street, located in Cork Street, central London.

References

External links
 Brian Fogarty website
 Brian Fogarty Prints website
 

Year of birth missing (living people)
Living people
People from Hackney Central
20th-century English novelists
21st-century English novelists
English short story writers
English male poets
20th-century English painters
English male painters
21st-century English painters
21st-century English male artists
English printmakers
English male short story writers
English male novelists
20th-century British short story writers
21st-century British short story writers
20th-century British printmakers
20th-century English male writers
21st-century English male writers
20th-century English male artists